The following outline is provided as an overview of and topical guide to human sexuality:

Human sexuality is the capacity to have erotic experiences and responses. Human sexuality can also refer to the way one person is sexually attracted to another person of the opposite sex (heterosexuality), the same sex (homosexuality), or having both tendencies (bisexuality). The lack of sexual attraction is referred to as asexuality. Human sexuality impacts cultural, political, legal and philosophical aspects of life, as well as being widely connected to issues of morality, ethics, theology, spirituality, or religion. It is not, however, directly tied to gender.

History of human sexuality 

History of human sexuality
 By period
 Sexuality in ancient Rome
 Homosexuality in ancient Rome
 Prostitution in ancient Rome
 Timeline of sexual orientation and medicine
 By region
 History of sex in India
 By subject
 By orientation
 History of bisexuality
 History of homosexuality
 History of lesbianism
 History of masturbation
 History of prostitution
 LGBT history
 History of same-sex unions
 Sexual revolution
 History of erotic depictions
 Golden Age of Porn
 Feminist Sex Wars

Types of human sexuality 

 By sex
 Male sexuality
 Female sexuality
 By age
 Child sexuality
 Genital play
 Playing doctor
 Adolescent sexuality
 Sexuality in older age
 By region
 Adolescent sexuality in the United States
 Sexuality in India
 Sexuality in Japan
 Sexuality in South Korea
 Sexuality in China
 Sexuality in the Philippines
 LGBT rights by country or territory

Sexual orientation 

Sexual orientation
 Sexual attraction –
 Heterosexuality – sexually attracted to the opposite sex.
 Homosexuality – sexually attracted to the same sex.
 Bisexuality – having both homosexual and heterosexual tendencies.
 Asexuality – not sexually attracted to either sex.
 Demographics of sexual orientation

Other sex-related identities 

 Sexual orientation identity
 Pansexuality
 Polysexuality
 Gender identity
 Transgender
 Sexual identity

Types of sexual activity 

Human sexual activity
 Foreplay
 Non-penetrative sex
 Exclusive
 Erotic massage – rubbing all over, with or without oil.
 "Dry humping" – frottage while clothed. This act is common, although not essential, in the dance style known as "grinding".
 Footjob – stimulating genitals with the feet.
 Handjob – stimulating the penis with the hand.
 Irrumatio –  a form of oral sex where a man thrusts his penis into someone else's mouth; in contrast to fellatio, where the penis is being actively orally excited by a fellator. Irrumatio can also refer to:
 Intercrural sex – (interfemoral sex) type of irrumation, where one partner places a phallic object or penis between the other partner's thighs.
 Intergluteal sex – when one partner places a phallic object or penis into the other partner's buttock cleavage or gluteal cleft.
 Mammary intercourse – when one partner rubs a phallic object or penis between the partner's breasts.
 Stimulation of nipples – stimulating the nipples, usually orally or manually.
 Sumata – type of stimulation of male genitals popular in Japanese brothels: the woman rubs the man's penis with her hands, thighs and labia majora.
 Tribadism – vulva-to-vulva rubbing, commonly known by its "scissoring" position.
 Frot – penis-to-penis rubbing.
 Non-exclusive
 Fingering – stimulating the vagina or anus with the fingers.
 Oral sex – stimulation of the genitalia by the use of mouth, lips, tongue, teeth or throat.
 Mutual Masturbation – two or more people stimulate themselves or one another sexually, usually with the hands.
 Autoeroticism
 Penetrative sex
 Sexual intercourse
 Anal sex – penetration of one person's anus with another's penis for sexual stimulation.
 Oral sex –
 Anilingus – oral stimulation of the anus or perineum.
 Cunnilingus – oral stimulation of a female's clitoris, vulva, or vagina.
 Fellatio – oral stimulation of a male's penis.
 Masturbation
 Fingering –
 Anal masturbation
 Fisting – involves inserting a hand into the vagina or rectum.
 Autoeroticism
 Sex toys
 Other
 Facial
 Group sex
 Vanilla sex
 Sexual roleplay
 Bondage and Discipline
 Dominance and Submission
 Erotic humiliation
 Sadism and Masochism
 Cock-and-ball torture
 Erotic spanking
 Bondage positions
 BDSM equipment
 Sexual fetishism
 Sexual slang
 Bareback –
 Bukkake –
 Circle jerk –
 Creampie –
 Cum shot –
 Cybersex –
 Felching –
 Gang bang –
 Pompoir –
 Quickie –
 Snowballing –
 Tea bag –
 Venus Butterfly –
 Sexual arousal
 Touch
 Erogenous zone
 Smell
 Perfume
 Cologne
 Sight
 Romantic setting
 Nudity
 Sound
 Moaning
 Dirty talk
 Related
 Aphrodisiac –
 Libido –
 Sexual fantasy

Physiological events 

 Sexual stimulation
 Sexual arousal
 Male
 Erection
 Female
 Clitoral erection
 Vaginal lubrication
 Orgasm
 Female ejaculation
 Male ejaculation
 Insemination
 Pregnancy

Unsorted 
 Incest
 Accidental incest
 Covert incest
 Mechanics of sex
 Edging (sexual practice)
 Erotic sexual denial
 Forced orgasm
 Sex magic
 Sexual sublimation

Sexology (science of sex) 

 Sexology – scientific study of human sexuality, including human sexual interests, behavior, and function. The term does not generally refer to the non-scientific study of sex, such as political analysis or social criticism.
 Sexuality in older age
 Biology and sexual orientation
 Environment and sexual orientation
 Fraternal birth order and male sexual orientation
 Handedness and sexual orientation
 Neuroscience and sexual orientation
 Prenatal hormones and sexual orientation
 Sexual orientation change efforts
 Sexual orientation hypothesis
 Sexual orientation identity

Sex education 

 Human reproduction
 Body image
 Sexual maturity
 Safe sex
 Sexually transmitted disease
 Birth control
 Condom
 Dental dam
 Postorgasmic illness syndrome
 Medicine
 Reproductive medicine
 Andrology
 Gynaecology
 Urology
 Sexual medicine
 Sex therapy
 Sex surrogate
 Sexual dysfunction
 Erectile dysfunction
 Hypersexuality
 Hyposexuality

Philosophy of sex 

 Sexual objectification
 Sexualization
 Pornographication

Culture

Legal aspects 

Sex and the law
 Laws
 Laws regarding child sexual abuse
 Laws regarding child pornography
 Laws regarding rape
 Laws regarding incest
 Laws regarding prostitution
 Age of consent
 Criminal transmission of HIV
 Incest
 Obscenity
 Public indecency
 Sexual assault
 Sexual harassment
 Sexual misconduct
 Sexual violence

Sexual assault 

Sexual assault
 Rape –
 Types
 Corrective rape
 Date rape
 Gang rape
 Marital rape
 Serial rape
 Prison rape
 Rape by deception
 War rape
 Effects and motivations
 Effects and aftermath of rape
 Rape trauma syndrome
 Motivation for rape
 Sociobiological theories of rape
 Rape culture
 Laws
 Statutory rape
 Rape shield law
 False accusation of rape
 Rape and punishment
 Rape investigation
 Rape kit
 Related
 History of rape
 Rape statistics
 Rape by gender
 Anti-rape device
 Rape crisis centers
 Rape pornography
 Rape and revenge films
 Rape fantasy
 Sexual harassment
 Sexual harassment in education
 Sexual abuse
 Child sexual abuse
 Child-on-child sexual abuse
 Religion and Sexual abuse
 Catholic sex abuse cases
 Roman Catholic sex abuse cases by country
 Ecclesiastical response to Catholic sex abuse cases
 Settlements and bankruptcies in Catholic sex abuse cases
 Curial response to Catholic sex abuse cases
 Media coverage of Catholic sex abuse cases
 Sexual violence
 Sexual violence by intimate partners
 Factors associated with being a victim of sexual violence

Religious aspects 

Sexuality

Religion and sexuality
 Buddhism
 Christianity and sexuality
 Catholicism
 Sex, gender and the Roman Catholic Church
 Catholic sex abuse cases
 Roman Catholic sex abuse cases by country
 Ecclesiastical response to Catholic sex abuse cases
 Settlements and bankruptcies in Catholic sex abuse cases
 Curial response to Catholic sex abuse cases
 Media coverage of Catholic sex abuse cases
 Sexuality in Christian demonology
 Islam
 Judaism
 Taoism and sexuality

Sexual orientation

 Christianity
 Buddhism
 Islam
 Haitian Vodou
 Hare Krishna movement
 Scientology
 Sikhism
 Unitarian Universalism
 Zoroastrianism

Psychological aspects 
 Psychosexual development
 Sexual attraction
 Sexual fantasy
 Libido
 Lust

Economic aspects 

Sex industry
 Adult video game
 Sex tourism
 Female sex tourism
 Child sex tourism
 Erotica
 Pornography
 Prostitution
 Sex museum
 Sex shop
 Sex toy
 Vibrator
 Sex doll
 Strip club

Human sexuality organizations 

 American Institute of Bisexuality
 Arse Elektronika
 BDSM organizations
 Fuck for Forest
 OneTaste
 Sex Addicts Anonymous
 Sex and Love Addicts Anonymous
 Sexaholics Anonymous
 Sexual Compulsives Anonymous
 Society for the Advancement of Sexual Health
 Survivors of Incest Anonymous

Literature 

 Manga, Genre: Hentai
 List of hentai authors
 Novels about ephebophilia
 Non-fiction books about prostitution
 Pornographic books
 Pornographic magazines
 Sex manuals

Encyclopedias about sex 
 Encyclopedia of Motherhood
 Encyclopedia of Unusual Sex Practices
 International Encyclopedia of Sexuality
 Queers in History

People 

 Prostitutes and courtesans

See also 

 Outline of relationships
 Animal sexual behaviour
 Index of human sexuality articles
 List of anarchist pornographic projects and models
 List of strip clubs

 Sexuality in Star Trek
 Sexuality in music videos
 Sexual slang
 African-American culture and sexual orientation
 Ego-dystonic sexual orientation
 Sexual orientation and gender identity at the United Nations
 Sexual orientation and military service
 Sexual orientation and the Canadian military
 Sexual orientation and the United States military
 Sexual orientation and the military of the Netherlands
 Sexual orientation and the military of the United Kingdom
 Sociosexual orientation
 Coitus reservatus
 Eroto-comatose lucidity
 Emergency contraceptive availability by country
 Unsimulated sex in film
 Family planning
 Marriage
 Paraphilia
 Polyamory
 Promiscuity
 Romance (love)
 Sexual abstinence
 Sexual addiction
 Sexual attraction
 Sexual capital
 Sexual ethics
 Sexual inhibition
 Sexual objectification
 Sexual slavery

References

External links 

 American Sexuality Magazine
 Glossario di sessuologia clinica – Glossary of clinical sexology
 History of Surveys of Sexual Behavior from Encyclopedia of Behavioral Statistics
 International Encyclopedia of Sexuality full text
 Janssen, D. F., Growing Up Sexually. Volume I. World Reference Atlas [full text]
 National Sexuality Resource Center
 Durex Global Sex Survey 2005 at data360.org
 POPLINE is a searchable database of the world's reproductive health literature.
 The Continuum Complete International Encyclopedia of Sexuality at the Kinsey Institute
 The Sexuality and Rights Institute
 The South and Southeast Asia Resource Centre on Sexuality

Sex positions
 
Human sexuality
Human sexuality